OGC Nice won Division 1 season 1958/1959 of the French Association Football League with 56 points.

Participating teams

 Olympique Alès
 Angers SCO
 RC Lens
 Lille OSC
 Limoges FC
 Olympique Lyonnais
 Olympique de Marseille
 AS Monaco
 FC Nancy
 OGC Nice
 Nîmes Olympique
 RC Paris
 Stade de Reims
 Stade Rennais UC
 AS Saint-Etienne
 UA Sedan-Torcy
 FC Sochaux-Montbéliard
 RC Strasbourg
 Toulouse FC
 US Valenciennes-Anzin

Final table

Promoted from Division 2, who will play in Division 1 season 1959/1960
 Le Havre AC: Champion of Division 2, (Winner of Coupe de France)
 Stade Français FC: runner-up of Division 2
 SC Toulon: Third place
 Bordeaux: Fourth place

Results

Top goalscorers

OGC Nice Winning Squad 1958-'59

Goal
 Georges Lamia

Defence
 André Chorda
 Alain Cornu
 César Hector Gonzales
 Alphonse Martinez
 Guy Poitevin

Midfield
 Ferenc Kocsur
 François Milazzo
 Vincent Scanella

Attack
 Jean-Pierre Alba
 Oumar Barrou
 Jacques Faivre
 Jacques Foix
 Alberto Muro
 Victor Nurenberg
Unknown
 René Vergé

Management
 Jean Luciano (Coach)

References

 Division 1 season 1958-1959 at pari-et-gagne.com

Ligue 1 seasons
French
1